The Best of Cameo, Volume 2 is a follow-up greatest hits album released by the funk group Cameo in 1996. Complementing The Best of Cameo from 1993, this collection  focuses on Cameo's lesser hits, but combined with the first volume, it spans nearly their entire career and offers a true presentation of the band.

Track listing
 "Don't Be So Cool" – 4:12 - Blackmon/Mills
 "I Want It Now" – 4:29 - Allen/Blackmon/Smith
 "In the Night" – 4:40 - Blackmon/DePayer
 "We're Goin' Out Tonight" – 4:39 - Blackmon/Jenkins/Leftenant
 "Why Have I Lost You" – 5:14 - Blackmon
 "Hangin' Downtown" – 5:06 - Hairston
 "It's Serious" – 8:07 - Blackmon/Johnson
 "Freaky Dancin'" – 5:20 - Blackmon/Jenkins
 "Keep It Hot" – 4:41 - Blackmon/Lockett
 "Be Yourself" – 4:07 - Blackmon/Jenkins/Singleton
 "Alligator Woman" – 3:39 - Blackmon/Jenkins/Singleton
 "Insane" – 4:56 - Blackmon
 "We All Know Who We Are" – 5:51 - Blackmon
 "Feel Me" – 6:08 -  Blackmon/Lockett
 "Your Love Takes Me Out" – 6:39 -  Blackmon

References

Cameo (band) compilation albums
1996 greatest hits albums
Mercury Records compilation albums